Parsa District, a part of Madhesh Province in Terai plain is one of the seventy-seven districts of Nepal. According to the locals, Parsa is named after Parashnath temple situated in Mahuwan.

Etymology
According to locals, the name of the district is derived from the Parsagadhi fort, where the Nepali Gorkhali Soldiers defeated British Soldiers.

Geography and Climate

Demographics
At the time of the 2011 Nepal census, Parsa District had a population of 601,017. Of these, 78.4% spoke Bhojpuri, 6.1% Nepali, 5.1% Maithili, 3.8% Tharu, 2.2% Urdu, 1.3% Tamang, 0.8% Rajasthani, 0.7% Newari, 0.3% Uranw/Urau, 0.2% Hindi, 0.2% Rai, 0.1% Bengali, 0.1% Doteli, 0.1% Magar and 0.1% other languages as their first language.

In terms of ethnicity/caste, 14.5% were Musalman, 8.4% Kurmi, 7.6% Tharu, 6.6% Yadav, 5.8% Kanu, 4.7% Chamar/Harijan/Ram, 4.2% Teli, 3.2% Koiri/Kushwaha, 2.8% Chhetri, 2.7% Dusadh/Paswan/Pasi, 2.6% Hill Brahmin, 2.6% Mallaha, 2.0% Baraee, 1.9% Kalwar, 1.8% Dhanuk, 1.7% Nuniya, 1.7% Tamang, 1.6% Musahar, 1.6% Newar, 1.6% Sonar, 1.5% Bin, 1.4% Dhobi, 1.4% Hajam/Thakur, 1.4% Kathabaniyan, 1.3% Lohar, 1.3% Tatma/Tatwa, 1.2% other Terai, 1.0% Terai Brahmin, 1.0% Kayastha, 0.9% Marwadi, 0.8% Sanyasi/Dasnami, 0.7% Rajput, 0.6% Kewat, 0.6% Kumal, 0.6% Kumhar, 0.6% Magar, 0.4% Yakkha, 0.3% Dhunia, 0.3% Jhangad/Dhagar, 0.3% Kami, 0.2% Bengali, 0.2% Damai/Dholi, 0.2% Dom, 0.2% Halkhor, 0.2% Kahar, 0.2% Mali, 0.2% Rai, 0.1% Badhaee, 0.1% Gaderi/Bhedihar, 0.1% Gurung, 0.1% Halwai, 0.1% Majhi, 0.1% Natuwa, 0.1% Rajbhar, 0.1% Sarki, 0.1% Thakuri and 0.1% others.

In terms of religion, 83.1% were Hindu, 14.5% Muslim, 1.7% Buddhist, 0.4% Kirati, 0.1% Christian and 0.1% others.

In terms of literacy, 55.7% could read and write, 2.9% could only read and 41.3% could neither read nor write.

Notable people 

 Ajay Chaurasiya - Nepali Congress leader, former minister and former Member of House of Representatives/Constituent Assembly
 Ajay Kumar Dwivedi - Nepali Congress leader and Member of Constituent Assembly
 Bina Jaiswal - Bina Jaiswal is a Nepalese politician, belonging to the Rastriya Prajatantra Party. She is a  member of Parliament currently serving as the member of the 2nd Federal Parliament of Nepal. 
 Mohammad Lalbabu Raut Gaddhi - First Chief Minister of Madhesh Province
 Om Prakash Sharma - Nepali Congress leader, member of provincial assembly and Minister of Energy and Water Supply of Madhesh Province
 Pradeep Yadav - Suspended leader of PSP-N and member of House of Representatives

Administration 
VDC/s and Municipalities (blue) in Parsa District
The district consists of one metropolitan city, three urban municipalities and ten rural municipalities. These are as follows:

 Birgunj Metropolitan
 Bahudarmai Municipality
 Parsagadhi Municipality
 Pokhariya Municipality
 Bindabasini Rural Municipality
  Dhobini Rural Municipality
 Chhipaharmai Rural Municipality
 Jagarnathpur Rural Municipality
 Jirabhawani Rural Municipality
 Kalikamai Rural Municipality
 Pakaha Mainpur Rural Municipality
 Paterwa Sugauli Rural Municipality
 Sakhuwa Prasauni Rural Municipality
 Thori Rural Municipality

Former Village Development Committees (VDCs) and municipalities

 Alau, Nepal
 Amarpatti
 Auraha
 Bagahi
 Bagbana
 Bageshwari
 Bahauri Pidari
 Bahuarba Bhatha
 Basadilwa
 Basantpur
 Belwa Parsauni
 Beriya Birta
 Bhauratar
 Bhawanipur
 Bhedihari
 Bhisawa
 Bijbaniya
 Bindyabasini
 Biranchi Barwa
 Birganj Municipality
 Biruwa Guthi
 Bisrampur
 Chorani
 Deukhana
 Dhobini
 Gadi
 Gamhariya
 Ghoddauda Pipra
 Ghore

 Govindapur
 Hariharpur
 Hariharpur Birta
 Harapatganj
 Harpur
 Jagarnathpur Sira
 Jaimanglapur
 Janikatala
 Jhauwa Guthi
 Jitpur
 Kauwa Ban Kataiya
 Lahawarthakari
 Lakhanpur
 Lal Parsa
 Langadi
 Lipani Birta
 Madhuban Mathaul
 Mahadevpatti
 Mahuwan
 Mainiyari
 Mainpur
 Mikhampur
 Mirjapur
 Mosihani
 Mudali
 Nagardaha
 Nirchuta
 Nirmal Basti
 Pancharukhi

 Parsauni Birta
 Parsauni Matha
 Patbari Tola-Warwa
 Paterwa Sugauli
 Pidariguthi
 Pokhariya Municipality
 Phulwariya
 Prasurampur
 Ramgadhawa
 Ramnagari
 Sabaithawa
 Sakhuwa Prasauni
 Samjhauta
 Sankar Saraiya
 Sapauli
 Sedhawa
 Shiva Worga
 Sirsiya Khalwatola
 Sonbarsa
 Srisiya
 Subarnapur
 Sugauli Birta
 Sugauli Partewa
 Surjaha
 Thori
 Tulsi Barba
 Udaypur Dhursi

References

 
Districts of Nepal established during Rana regime or before
Districts of Madhesh Province